"Les yeux de la mama" is a song by Kendji Girac from the album Ensemble.

Charts

Weekly charts

Year-end charts

References

Songs about mothers
2015 singles
French-language songs
2015 songs
Kendji Girac songs
Songs written by Nazim Khaled
Pop ballads
2010s ballads
Mercury Records singles
Universal Music Group singles